McDowell or MacDowell may refer to:

People
 McDowell (surname), includes MacDowell
McDowell Lake First Nation, Ontario, an Oji-Cree First Nation band government

Places

Canada 
MacDowell Lake, a lake in Ontario

United States
 McDowell, Kentucky, an unincorporated community
 McDowell, Missouri, an unincorporated community
 McDowell County, North Carolina
 McDowell County, West Virginia
 McDowell Valley AVA, California wine region in Mendocino County
 MacDowell (artists' residency and workshop), formerly MacDowell Colony, an art colony in Peterborough, New Hampshire

Streams
 McDowell Run (Bull Creek tributary), in southwestern Pennsylvania

Other uses 
 McDowell's No.1, a subsidiary of United Breweries Group in India
 McDowell, Obolensky Inc., a defunct American publisher

See also 
 McDowell's (disambiguation)
 McDowall (disambiguation)
 Dowell (disambiguation)